Myroides guanonis is a psychrotolerant, strictly aerobic, rod-shaped and non-motile bacterium from the genus of Myroides which has been isolated from a prehistoric painting from the Magura Cave in Bulgaria.

References

Flavobacteria
Bacteria described in 2013